The 2016 Canadian Mixed Doubles Curling Trials were held from March 31 to April 3 at the Nutana Curling Club in Saskatoon, Saskatchewan.

Teams
The teams are listed as follows:

Provincial and Territorial champions

Open entries

Round robin standings

Playoffs

Round of 12
Saturday, April 2, 8:30 pm

Quarterfinals
Sunday, April 3, 10:00 am

Semifinals
Sunday, April 3, 1:00 pm

Final
Sunday, April 3, 4:00 pm

References

External links

Canadian Mixed Doubles Curling Championship
2016 in Canadian curling
Curling in Saskatoon
2016 in Saskatchewan